Chisocheton sarasinorum is a tree in the family Meliaceae. It is named for the Swiss explorers and botanists Karl Friedrich Sarasin and Paul Benedict Sarasin.

Description
The bark is greyish green. The flowers are white.

Distribution and habitat
Chisocheton sarasinorum is found in Borneo and Sulawesi. Its habitat is rain forests from sea-level to  altitude.

References

sarasinorum
Trees of Borneo
Trees of Sulawesi
Plants described in 1937